FUS-interacting serine-arginine-rich protein 1 is a protein that in humans is encoded by the SFRS13A gene.

Function 

This gene product is a member of the serine-arginine (SR) family of proteins, which is involved in constitutive and regulated RNA splicing. Members of this family are characterized by N-terminal RNP1 and RNP2 motifs, which are required for binding to RNA, and multiple C-terminal SR/RS repeats, which are important in mediating association with other cellular proteins. This protein can influence splice site selection of adenovirus E1A pre-mRNA. It interacts with the oncoprotein TLS, and abrogates the influence of TLS on E1A pre-mRNA splicing. Alternative splicing of this gene results in at least two transcript variants encoding different isoforms. In addition, transcript variants utilizing alternative polyA sites exist.

Interactions 

FUSIP1 has been shown to interact with FUS.

References

Further reading